Duke of Castro or Duchess of Castro may refer to:

As reigning dukes, rulers of the Duchy of Castro of the House of Farnese (1537–1649):
Pier Luigi Farnese, 1st Duke of Castro from 1537 to 1545 (1503–1547)
Ottavio Farnese, 2nd Duke of Castro from 1537 to 1545 (1545–1547)
Orazio Farnese, 3rd Duke of Castro from 1547 to 1553 (1547–1553)
Ottavio Farnese, 4th Duke of Castro from 1553 to 1586 (1524–1586)
Alexander Farnese, 5th Duke of Castro from 1586 to 1592 (1545–1592)
Ranuccio I Farnese, 6th Duke of Castro from 1592 to 1622 (1569–1622)
Odoardo Farnese, 7th Duke of Castro from 1622 to 1646 (1612–1646)
Ranuccio II Farnese, 8th Duke of Castro from 1646 to 1649 (1630–1694)
As titular dukes, heads of the House of Bourbon-Two Sicilies (1861–present): 
Francis II, King of the Two Sicilies from 1859 to 1861, and Duke of Castro from 1861 to 1894 (1836–1894)
Prince Alfonso of Bourbon-Two Sicilies, Duke of Castro from 1894 to 1934 (1841–1934)
Prince Ferdinand Pius of Bourbon-Two Sicilies, Duke of Castro from 1934 to 1960 (1869–1960)
Prince Ranieri of Bourbon-Two Sicilies, Duke of Castro from 1960 to 1973 (1883–1973)
Prince Ferdinand Maria of Bourbon-Two Sicilies, Duke of Castro from 1973	to 2008 (1926–2008)
Prince Carlo of Bourbon-Two Sicilies, Duke of Castro from 2008 to present (born 1963)

See also
 Duchy of Castro
 House of Castro
 Castro (surname)
 Castro (disambiguation)